Wilkes County Courthouse may refer to:

Wilkes County Courthouse (Georgia), Washington, Georgia
Wilkes County Courthouse (North Carolina), Wilkesboro, North Carolina